2015 Denmark Open is a darts tournament, which took place in Esbjerg, Denmark in 2015.

Results

Last 64

Last 16

References

2015 in darts
2015 in Danish sport
Darts in Denmark